Phytosus nigriventris  is a species of rove beetle in the family Staphylinidae.

References

Staphylinidae
Beetles described in 1843